Old Town Manor, formerly Eaton Lodge, is a Victorian manor house and bed and breakfast inn in Key West, Florida. It is located at 511 Eaton Street, just steps off Duval Street in the heart of "Old Town" Key West. 

The "Old Town" neighborhood is on the west side of the island and comprises the Key West Historic District. The Historic District of Key West is listed on the National Register of Historic Places. Major tourist destinations include the nightly Sunset Celebration at Mallory Square; Fort Zachary Taylor; the southernmost point in the continental United States; the Duval Street bar and restaurant district; the Audubon House and Tropical Gardens; the Key West Lighthouse and Keeper's Quarters Museum; and, Nobel Prize–winning author Ernest Hemingway's former home, now open to the public as the Ernest Hemingway House. Classic bungalows and guest mansions characterize the district.

Many guests of Old Town Manor rent bicycles and take trolley or walking tours to explore "Old Town" Key West and participate in boat excursions to experience the surrounding waters.

Since the property now known as Old Town Manor was built by Samuel Otis Johnson in 1886, it has served as his grocery and butcher shop, a residence with doctor's office, a boardinghouse, and a bed and breakfast inn.

Samuel Otis Johnson had a shop to the right of the house, which
was moved to the rear of the property in the early 1900s for garage
[carriage house] use. By then this property had become the home and
office of Dr. Richard William Warren and remained in the family until
the death of his widow Genevieve Warren (also known as "Miss Gen") in the early 1970s.

Architectural features 
Old Town Manor is a three-story Victorian mansion built in the classical Greek Revival style. The main property still boasts the original cypress front door and much original woodwork, including moldings and some flooring. The lobby contains a fireplace and a built-in mahogany bookcase, with a Colonial staircase leading to the hall. The property is also home to the tallest cistern in the Keys. Three stories high, it dates back to when Key West was dependent on rainwater only and remains at the rear of the property.

Built by Samuel Otis Johnson in 1886, the house was extensively remodeled in 1937 by the architect Jack Long, who kept its historic character intact.

There are currently fourteen rooms at Old Town Manor, including the main property and carriage house. Shades of green have been utilized throughout much of the interior space.

The Warren family 
In 1911, Genevieve Allen married Dr. William Richard Warren, a Key West native and
prominent surgeon and general practitioner. They had two sons (George
Allen and William R. Jr.) and one daughter (Leonor). The Warrens bought the property at 511 Eaton Street in 1913.

Born in Key West and educated at the University of Pennsylvania, Dr. Warren practiced general medicine from the house. Its ground floor front porch is said to have been the waiting room for patients, with interior rooms on site for physical examinations and minor surgeries.

Each story of the main property has a front porch, formerly called "piazzas" by Mrs. Warren. A descendant from one of the island's oldest families, she had a reputation for being an excellent hostess. She often entertained with informal luncheons in the garden and was famous for serving crawfish bisque, which she credited to her cook of 24 years, Maude Ashe.

In what is now the lobby of Old Town Manor, a portrait of Mrs. Warren's grandmother, Mary Nieves Ximenz Browne (of Spanish-Corsican ancestry), once hung above the living room mantel. Her grandparents came to the Keys from Saint Augustine in the early 1820s to be the first lighthouse keepers at Dry Tortugas, a remote set of islands located about 70 miles from Key West.

Mrs. Warren's father, George W. Allen, was president of the First National Bank
of Key West and one of Florida's best-known Republicans;
he served twice as senator and was nominated for governor in 1896.

According to the 1930 U.S. Census, when his home at 511 Eaton Street had a value of $8,000, William Richard Warren's father was born in Rhode Island, and his mother was born in the Bahamas.

511 Eaton Street boasted one of the first ornamental gardens of the Keys. Genevieve Warren framed her impressive orchid collection with winding red brick pathways and borders around circular planting areas. She had topsoil brought in from Florida's panhandle and utilized the unusual three-story cistern for watering. The thriving garden still contains a fishpond fountain, rare palms more than a century old, a Brazilian jacaranda tree with blue bell-shaped flowers, and two large tamarind trees native to India.

Recognition and Trivia 
Old Town Manor was granted a Couples' Choice Award from WeddingWire as a top wedding venue in the Florida Keys in 2012, 2013, 2014 and 2015  and it was named Best Bed & Breakfast in Florida Monthly magazine's 2011 Best of Florida Awards.

Old Town Manor and its sister property Rose Lane Villas are among the Keys' first certified members of the Florida Department of Environmental Protection's Green Lodging Program. Their green practices include purchasing recycled paper products, high-efficiency light bulbs, installing photo sensors for outdoor lighting, using environmentally sound cleaning products, and instituting a towel and linen reuse program.

Old Town Manor is a stop on the popular "Original Ghost Tour"  and "Key West Ghosts."

The current owners of Old Town Manor are engaged in the community as supporters of the non-profit Tropic Cinema, the Key West SPCA (Society for the Prevention of Cruelty to Animals), and The Key West Literary Seminar, a celebration of writers and writing held each January.

References

External links

Rose Lane Villas
Official City Website
Chamber of Commerce Website

Houses in Key West, Florida
Florida Keys
Hotels in Florida
Bed and breakfasts in Florida
Greek Revival architecture in Florida
Houses completed in 1886